John Arbuthnott, 10th Viscount of Arbuthnott  DL (b. Kincardineshire 20 July 1843 – d. Arbuthnott House 30 November 1895) was the son of John Arbuthnott, 9th Viscount of Arbuthnott whom he succeeded in 1891. Lt. 49th Foot Regiment. He was Deputy Lieutenant for Kincardineshire.

Married Anna Harriet Allen (born London 1852/3, died at Arbuthnott House 23 April 1892) at the home of her uncle, Inchmartine House, Inchture (Errol), 20 April 1871). Anna Harriet Allen was the only daughter of Edmund Allen of Strathmartin.

John Arbuthnott, 10th Viscount of Arbuthnott was succeeded by his brother David Arbuthnott, 11th Viscount of Arbuthnott.

References 
 Mrs P. S-M Arbuthnot, Memories of the Arbuthnots (1920). George Allen Unwin Ltd.

External links

1843 births
1895 deaths
Deputy Lieutenants of Kincardineshire
John Arbuthnott, 10th Viscount
10